Philippe Roux (born 7 December 1952) is a Swiss former alpine skier who competed in the 1976 Winter Olympics. He's currently a rally driver who completed in multiple editions of Rallye Monte-Carlo, with the best result of 16th place and Rallye du Valais - which the won 3 times, in 1978, 1988 and 1992, along with 8 more podiums.

External links
 sports-reference.com

1952 births
Living people
Swiss male alpine skiers
Swiss racing drivers
Olympic alpine skiers of Switzerland
Alpine skiers at the 1976 Winter Olympics
24 Hours of Le Mans drivers